Vladislav Antonov (born 5 December 1966) is a Russian boxer. He competed in the men's bantamweight event at the 1992 Summer Olympics.

References

1966 births
Living people
Russian male boxers
Olympic boxers of the Unified Team
Boxers at the 1992 Summer Olympics
Sportspeople from Saint Petersburg
AIBA World Boxing Championships medalists
Bantamweight boxers